Gillian Griffiths, FMedSci FRS is a British cell biologist and immunologist. Griffiths was one of the first to show that immune cells have specialised mechanisms of secretion, and identified proteins and mechanisms that control cytotoxic T lymphocyte secretion. Griffiths is Professor of Cell Biology and Immunology at the University of Cambridge and is the Director of the Cambridge Institute for Medical Research.

Education
When she was young, Griffiths initially thought she might like to be an ecologist. However, she began her scientific career at University College London by studying immunology. She continued in the subject, undertaking her PhD at the MRC Laboratory of Molecular Biology in Cambridge supervised by César Milstein.

Awards and honours
Griffiths holds a Wellcome Trust Principal Research Fellowship and she is a Fellow at King's College, Cambridge. Griffiths was elected a Fellow of the Royal Society in 2013. Her nomination for the Royal Society reads 

2019: Awarded the Buchanan Medal of the Royal Society.

References

External links
Under the Microscope Killer T-cells video

20th-century British biologists
20th-century British women scientists
21st-century British biologists
21st-century British women scientists
Academics of the University of Cambridge
Alumni of the University of Cambridge
Alumni of University College London
British immunologists
British women biologists
Fellows of King's College, Cambridge
Fellows of the Academy of Medical Sciences (United Kingdom)
Fellows of the Royal Society
Female Fellows of the Royal Society
Living people
Wellcome Trust Principal Research Fellows
Year of birth missing (living people)